Deh Chal Deli Rich-e Olya (also Romanized as Deh Chal Delī Rīch-e ‘Olyā) is a village in Margown Rural District, Margown District, Boyer-Ahmad County, Kohgiluyeh and Boyer-Ahmad Province, Iran. At the 2006 census, its population was 115, in 17 families.

References 

Populated places in Boyer-Ahmad County